The 1906 South Dakota gubernatorial election was held on November 6, 1906. Incumbent Republican Governor Samuel H. Elrod ran for re-election, but was defeated for renomination at the Republican convention by former Attorney General Coe I. Crawford. In the general election, Crawford was opposed by the Democratic nominee, former State Representative John A. Stransky of Brule County. Crawford had little difficulty defeating Stransky in a landslide, largely matching Elrod's margin of victory from two years earlier.

Republican convention
In January 1906, former Attorney General Coe I. Crawford, who unsuccessfully ran for Governor in 1904, announced that he would challenge Governor Samuel H. Elrod for renomination, queueing up a contest between the insurgent wing of the party, led by U.S. Senator Robert J. Gamble, and the stalwart wing of the party, also referred to as the "machine." As county delegates were elected to the convention, Crawford-affiliated delegates won a clear majority, though both sides claimed that they would win. In the end, however, Crawford defeated Elrod at the convention by a wide margin, winning 893 votes to Elrod's 476, with Crawford's political allies winning the convention's nomination, as well.

Democratic conventions
In the weeks leading to the Democratic convention in June 1906, no clear frontrunner for the Party's nomination emerged. Former Governor Andrew E. Lee was mentioned as a possibility, though he declined to run. Former Hughes County Sheriff and former Deputy U.S. Marshal Ben Ash and former State Representative John A. Stransky were the other two potential candidates. Stransky ended up winning the nomination.

General election

Results

References

South Dakota
1906
Gubernatorial
November 1906 events